The list of ship decommissionings in 1999 includes a chronological list of all ships decommissioned in 1999.



See also

1999
 
Ship